Saikul Legislative Assembly constituency is one of the 60 Legislative Assembly constituencies of Manipur state in India.

It is part of Kangpokpi district and is reserved for candidates belonging to the Scheduled Tribes.

Members of the Legislative Assembly

Election results

2017

See also
 List of constituencies of the Manipur Legislative Assembly
 Senapati district

References

External links
 

Senapati district
Assembly constituencies of Manipur